Mark Coulier (born 1964) is a British make-up artist and prosthetic makeup expert, who has worked in the Harry Potter film series,  X-Men and The Mummy Returns.

He and J. Roy Helland won the Academy Award for Best Makeup and BAFTA Award for Best Makeup and Hair for The Iron Lady (2011).

Coulier received his second Oscar for the film The Grand Budapest Hotel at the 87th Academy Awards. His win was shared with Frances Hannon.

Selected filmography
 The Mummy Returns (2001)
 Harry Potter and the Philosopher's Stone (2001)
 The League of Extraordinary Gentlemen (2003)
 Harry Potter and the Goblet of Fire (2005)
 Harry Potter and the Order of the Phoenix (2007)
 Harry Potter and the Half-Blood Prince (2009)
 Harry Potter and the Deathly Hallows – Part 1 (2010)
 X-Men: First Class (2011)
 Harry Potter and the Deathly Hallows – Part 2 (2011)
  The Iron Lady (2011)
 World War Z (2013)
 Dracula Untold (2014)
 The Grand Budapest Hotel (2014)
 In the Heart of the Sea (2015)
 Spectre (2015)
 Suspiria (2018)
 Pinocchio (2019)
 Elvis (2022)

Television
 Merlin (TV series) (2008-2011)

References

External links
 
 Mark Coulier's Coulier Creatures, website

1964 births
Living people
British make-up artists
Best Makeup Academy Award winners
Best Makeup BAFTA Award winners
Emmy Award winners
People from Leyland, Lancashire